The men's 200 metres event at the 1991 Summer Universiade was held at the Don Valley Stadium in Sheffield on 23 and 24 July 1991.

Medalists

Results

Heats
Wind:Heat 1: +0.9 m/s, Heat 2: +0.5 m/s, Heat 3: +1.4 m/s, Heat 4: +0.4 m/s, Heat 5: +1.3 m/s, Heat 6: +1.3 m/s, Heat 7: +1.6 m/s

Quarterfinals
Wind:Heat 1: +2.3 m/s, Heat 2: +1.8 m/s, Heat 3: +1.6 m/s, Heat 4: +2.6 m/s

Semifinals
Wind:Heat 1: +2.0 m/s, Heat 2: +2.3 m/s

Final

Wind: +1.0 m/s

References

Athletics at the 1991 Summer Universiade
1991